{{DISPLAYTITLE:C17H23N5O2}}
The molecular formula C17H23N5O2 (molar mass: 329.40 g/mol, exact mass: 329.1852 u) may refer to:

 Quinazosin
 Sunepitron (CP-93,393)

Molecular formulas